Waddar, or Vadari, is a Dravidian language which belongs to the Telugu branch of its South-Central family, spoken among social caste of Waddars scattered over South India, especially in Karnataka, where it has a status of Scheduled caste. 200,000 people reported their languages as 'Vadari' in the 2011 census. Ethnologue treats it as separate Dravidian language closely related to Telugu, but without clear grounds. Waddars show their close relevance to Kaikadis.

References

 Chandrashekhar Bhat. Ethnicity and Mobility: Emerging Ethnic Identity and Social Mobility Among the Waddars of South India. Concept Publishing Company, 1984.

Agglutinative languages
Dravidian languages